Gregor Horvatič (born 21 December 1977) is a Slovenian politician and football manager, former president of Slovenian Democratic Youth (SDM). Currently he leads the department of communications, public relations, and public affairs in NK Dob. On national football level he is a Member of International Commission of The Football Association of Slovenia. or NZS).

Life
Horvatič was born in Ljubljana. He resides in Dob, Municipality of Domžale.

Political career 
Horvatič joined the Slovenian Democratic Youth in 1997. He was elected chairman of the organization at the Congress of SDM in Maribor on 17 May 2008.

Before the election to chairman of the Slovenian Democratic Youth, Horvatič was a member of the National Board of SDM, member of permanent commission of the National Youth Council of Slovenia, chairman of municipality board of SDM Domžale (2003-2009), board and supervisory commission member in the Youth Council of Domzale municipality, and worked as a team leader at a local youth community center Domžale municipality.

On an international youth policy level Horvatič was active as a member of international group of SDM. He was most active in the International Young Democrat Union, the Youth of the European People's Party, Democrat Youth Community of Europe, and the Youth Union of the Alps region, Jungen Alpenregion. On international policy level he also cooperated with the Konrad Adenauer Foundation.

2010 Slovenian local election 
In October 2010 Gregor Horvatič was elected as the candidate of the Alliance for the Future
().  Local elections are designed to elect mayors and members of municipal councils, members of the district and village communities. With his own list he participated in local elections for member in the municipality council of Municipality of Domžale.

2014 Slovenian parliamentary election 
In the 2014 Slovenian parliamentary election Horvatič was a candidate of the Civic List, but won no seat.

2014 Slovenian local election 
In October 2014 Horvatič was elected as the candidate of the Alliance for the Future. For the second time in his career he participated with his own list in local elections for member in the municipality council of Municipality of Domžale.

2018 Slovenian parliamentary election 
In the 2018 Slovenian parliamentary election Horvatič was a candidate of the Andrej Čuš and Greens of Slovenia (but won no seat.

2018 Slovenian local election 
In November 2018 Horvatič was elected as the candidate of the Greens of Slovenia (. For the third time in his career he participated in local elections for member in the municipality council of Municipality of Domžale and he was elected and won seat in the municipality council of Municipality of Domžale

2022 Slovenian local election 
In November 2022 Horvatič was elected as the candidate of the Freedom Movement (GS), a social liberal and green liberal political party. For the fourth time in his career he participated in local elections for member in the municipality council of Municipality of Domžale and he was elected and won seat in the municipality council of Municipality of Domžale

Football work 
In October 2008, Horvatič was appointed as a vice-president of Football club Vir (NK Vir). He took over the reorganization of the club and began to lead the department for public relations.

In December 2013, Horvatič was appointed as a chief communications officer and public relations officer of NK Doband began to lead the department of communications, public relations, and public affairs.  Nogometni Klub Dob due to sponsorship reasons is named NK Roltek Dob, and they currently play in the Slovenian Second League.

In June 2021 executive board of football in Slovenia is governed by the Football Association of Slovenia. or NZS),the governing body of football in Slovenia appointed Horvatič as a Member of International Commission of The Football Association of Slovenia. or NZS) for mandate periode 2021–2025.

References

External links
 Football Association of Slovenia ( 
Official page of Football club Dob (NK Dob) 
Official page of Football club Vir (NK Vir)  
Official page of Slovenian democratic youth (SDM)
Official page of Youth council of Domžale municipality
Youth of Alps Region/Junge Alpenregion Facebook page
Official page of Civic List (Slovenia)
Official page of Slovenian local elections 2010 
Official page of Slovenian local elections 2014 
Official page of Slovenian parliamentary elections 2014 
Official page of Slovenian parliamentary elections 2018 
Official page of Slovenian local elections  2018 
Official page of Slovenian local elections 2022 

1977 births
Living people
Politicians from Ljubljana
Slovenian Democratic Party politicians
Slovenian football managers
People from the Municipality of Domžale